Sankhata is an adjective or noun for any phenomena conditioned by other phenomena, as in produced by a cause, for it does not arise on its own. It also denotes mental creations in the Pali language. As explained by the dependent origination concept (see:Twelve Nidanas), sankhatas condition the consciousness (vijnana) and are conditioned by ignorance (avidyā). Sankhatas are part of the name and form (see:Namarupa) and so are one of the five aggregates (see:skandhas).

Sankhata is contrasted with Asankhata, which means Unconditioned (that which is of its own without any dependence on conditioned phenomena) referring to Nibbana.

Creations list
Sankhatas can be either pernicious, neutral or positive - associated with similar consciousness.

Buddhist philosophical concepts